Catoptria incertellus is a moth species in the family Crambidae. It is found in Russia, southern Armenia, northwestern Iran, and northeastern Turkey.

The wingspan is {15.5-19.5 mm for females and 16-20.5 mm for males. Adults are on wing from the end of May to the end of September, with one generation per year. There might be a partial second generation.

References

Crambini
Moths of Asia
Moths described in 1852